Harold Logan (1906-1995) was an Australian rules footballer who played for the  Football Club. During his career he averaged over two goals a game and won a premiership with Port Adelaide in 1928.

Harold Logan kicked four goals during the 1928 SAFL Grand Final against .

References

Port Adelaide Football Club (SANFL) players
Port Adelaide Football Club players (all competitions)
1906 births
1995 deaths
Australian rules footballers from South Australia